McDowell is an unincorporated community in Highland County, Virginia, United States. It is in the Bullpasture Valley near the mouth of Crab Run on the Bullpasture River. The community was named after James McDowell, governor of Virginia from 1843 to 1846. McDowell is the location of the May 8, 1862 Battle of McDowell during the American Civil War. The community has a post office with ZIP code 24458 that was established in 1828.

The Crab Run Lane Truss Bridge, Mansion House, and McClung Farm Historic District are listed on the National Register of Historic Places.
RiverRun Farm, a sheep, wool and lamb producing farm is located just south if the conflunce of Crab Run and the Bullpasture River.

References

Unincorporated communities in Highland County, Virginia
Unincorporated communities in Virginia